The Communauté de communes du Vimeu Industriel  is a former communauté de communes in the Somme département and in the  Picardie région of France. It was created in December 1996. It was merged into the new Communauté de communes du Vimeu in January 2017.

Composition 
This Communauté de communes included 14 communes:

Aigneville
Béthencourt-sur-Mer
Bourseville
Chépy
Feuquières-en-Vimeu
Fressenneville
Friville-Escarbotin
Méneslies
Nibas
Ochancourt
Tully
Valines
Woincourt
Yzengremer

See also 
Communes of the Somme department

References 

Vimeu Industriel